Iosif Culineac (13 August 1941 – 26 July 2022) was a Romanian water polo player. He competed at the 1964 Summer Olympics and the 1972 Summer Olympics.

References

External links
 

1941 births
2022 deaths
Romanian male water polo players
Olympic water polo players of Romania
Water polo players at the 1964 Summer Olympics
Water polo players at the 1972 Summer Olympics
Water polo players from Bucharest